Medical Emergency Relief International (Merlin) is a former British international non-governmental health charity which sends medical experts to global emergencies. In July 2013, Merlin merged with Save the Children.

History

Merlin was founded in 1993 by Dr Christopher Besse, Nicholas Mellor and Mark Dalton to create a British charity to send medical teams into disaster zones and then to prevent disease and help develop local health services. Its first mission was to send a convoy to Bosnia carrying £1 million worth of essential food and medicines. Since then Merlin has grown into a specialist charity aimed at responding to natural disasters and humanitarian emergencies, then staying on to rebuild the capacity of local health services. To date, Merlin has worked in over 40 countries and responded to some of the most serious humanitarian emergencies of recent history. These include the Asian tsunami, Darfur and the cyclone in Burma. Merlin has also responded to the 2010 Haiti earthquake and the flooding in Pakistan.

In July 2013, Merlin merged with Save the Children.

Notable activities by region

Africa
Democratic Republic of Congo: Merlin has been working in DRC since 1997 when it provided emergency assistance to refugees in the east of the country. Since 2002, the charity has been working with communities to rebuild over 100 health facilities, providing drugs and training local health staff, ensuring they have the medicines and the expertise to provide good quality health care. Merlin also supports several hospitals, including Kindu Hospital, the largest in Maniema Province, treating 2,000 patients every month.

Merlin has worked in Kenya since 1998, running voluntary HIV testing and counseling clinics in Turkana for nomadic pastoralists, and a similar project which supports patients receiving anti-retroviral treatment in the Great Rift Valley. Since many people with TB have also contracted HIV and vice versa, Merlin is working with the Kenyan government to encourage HIV-positive people and TB patients to be tested for both infections. In Nyanza in the western highlands of Kenya, Merlin is training locals to provide home-based care for HIV-positive people. After the re-appearance of malaria in Nyanza, Merlin is training community health workers to identify, to reduce and prevent malaria by raising awareness, by distributing bed nets and by spraying people's homes with insecticide.

Liberia: Due to lack of qualified health workers, a dilapidated health infrastructure and insufficient government funds, Liberia's health care system is only beginning to make the transition from an emergency to development phase. Since 1997, Merlin has been working with the Ministry of Health to renovate health facilities, supply medicines and equipment, and train and supervise health workers.

Sudan: In 2004, when Merlin's teams began setting up health services, most people made homeless by militia attacks had no opportunity to get medical care. Merlin now operates a network of clinics serving eight settlements which have been inundated by people fleeing the conflict. On average 134,000 are treated every six months.

Middle East

Merlin began working in Afghanistan in 1994, providing essential health services for vulnerable people in some of the most remote and hard to reach areas of the country. Reproductive health care in Afghanistan is particularly inadequate, resulting in some of the highest maternal and child mortality rates in the world. For a time only 14% of deliveries were attended by a trained midwife, and in isolated rural areas, women faced a one in three lifetime risk of dying during pregnancy or childbirth. Merlin opened a midwife training centre in Taloqan in the north-eastern province of Takhar in April 2006. Since then many students have graduated and are now providing essential maternal health care for more than 84,000 women.

The 2003 Bam earthquake: On 26 December 2003, an earthquake measuring 6.6 on the moment magnitude scale struck the ancient city of Bam in Iran, killing more than 26,000 people and leaving 75,000 homeless. Merlin responded within 72 hours of the disaster, sending in a team to carry out health assessments and to distribute emergency medical supplies, hygiene packs, and essential water and sanitation items. Merlin stayed in Bam for more than a year following the disaster, and helped build or refurbish 32 medical houses and 11 health centres.

 Merlin was one of the first international humanitarian organisations to enter Baghdad just days after the collapse of Saddam Hussein's regime in April 2003. Teams delivered emergency health kits and medical supplies to paediatric hospitals and health clinics throughout Baghdad, focusing on the most vulnerable groups such as women and children. Merlin also helped train and equip local health authorities to restart their activities and rehabilitate their war-ravaged infrastructure. In many areas of Baghdad, water and sanitation systems had become very poorly maintained, with some areas regularly flooded by sewage. In response, Merlin implemented water and sanitation projects, that helped approximately 35,000 people in the Greater Baghdad area.

Palestinian Territories: Merlin has worked in the Palestinian Territories since 2002. It has implemented programmes in both Gaza and the West Bank, aiming to increase access to health care and improve rural health care, in particular. In 2007, Merlin began operating exclusively in Qalqilya and Salfit districts of the West Bank – the areas most isolated by the separation barrier. Following the violence in the Gaza Strip in December 2008/January 2009. Merlin has increased community access to primary and specialist medical services through mobile and fixed clinics, and improved the availability of safe blood supplies. It has also conducted home visits and health education to reduce disease through early diagnosis.

North America
 
Merlin launched an emergency response within 48 hours of the earthquake and mobilised a specialised surgical and medical team to Delmas 33, a suburb of Port-au-Prince. On an abandoned tennis court, Merlin established a fully functional, tented surgical hospital. In partnership with Medicos del Mundo (MDM Spain), Merlin is also operating a mobile clinic team in and around the rural areas of Petit Goave and Grand Goave, which are two hours from the capital of Port-au-Prince. The mobile clinic circuit includes seven villages, each of which are underserved with significant health needs. Merlin's teams of doctors and nurses offer basic, maternal and neo-natal health care, while referring more severe cases to local hospitals for secondary treatment as needed

North Asia
Following the collapse of communism in the Former Soviet Union, Russia experienced a 42% increase in cases of tuberculosis (TB). Merlin worked for over ten years with TB patients at Tomsk in Siberia.  Merlin pioneered treatment methods, combining traditional systems with new home-based treatment, to combat the rise in the disease. The work was so successful that it was adopted by the Russian Ministry of Health as the nationwide flagship programme for TB treatment. Merlin also supported a hospital TB ward, and supported TB-infected prisoners with medical and social support before and after their release. At the close of programmes, TB incidences had fallen by 6% in Tomsk, whereas elsewhere in Russia they had risen by 10%.

In 2006 the Russian Federal Security Service accused Merlin and other foreign NGOs of being covers for foreign intelligence gathering operations.  However, this is reflective an overall trend of suspicion by the Russian government of NGOs, as in 2012 they passed a law requiring all politically active foreign NGOs to register as 'foreign agents' and to file quarterly reports on their finances.

Southeast Asia
Cyclone Nargis: The Irrawaddy Delta area of Burma was devastated by Cyclone Nargis in May 2008, leaving more than 130,000 people dead or missing and a million displaced. Since Merlin teams were already working in Burma before the cyclone, they were among the first to deliver a response to the diasaster, setting up first aid points in Laputta and treating at least 250 patients a day in the first week.

The Asian tsunami: Merlin arrived in Sri Lanka less than 48 hours after the tsunami disaster of December 2004, and was the first international health non-governemtal organisation to plan a co-ordinated relief effort with the local Ministry of Health. They also had teams on the ground in Indonesia and Burma. By the end of 2007 Merlin had helped an estimated 287,000 households in Ampara and Batticaloa, Sri Lanka, by constructing and rehabilitating clinics and hospitals damaged by conflict and the tsunami.

Hands Up for Health Workers campaign
Hands Up for Health Workers is Merlin's campaign to combat the global shortage of skilled health workers. Merlin campaigns for national governments and international donors to develop national health workforce plans to train, equip, pay and support health workers in crisis countries.

Funding
The majority of funds comes from institutional donors, which include the UK's Department for International Development, the United States Agency for International Development and the European Commission. As a member of the Disasters Emergency Committee (DEC), which coordinates fundraising appeals for major disasters overseas, Merlin also receives an allocation of the total amounts raised. A small but increasing percentage is voluntary income. This includes private grant-making trusts and foundations, companies and donations from members of the public. Individuals organise diverse fundraising events, as well as being sponsored to take part in various 'challenge events' such as:

The London Marathon
The Welsh 3000s
The London to Paris Bike Ride
The Run to the Beat Half Marathon
The Great South Run
Skydiving

Footnotes

References

 

t

Health charities in the United Kingdom
International organisations based in London
Organisations based in the London Borough of Islington
Organizations established in 1993
1993 establishments in the United Kingdom